Jon Nicholson is a Formula One photographer.

Nicholson worked closely with Damon Hill, with him producing a book at the end of the  season. For the  season, Nicholson moved on to focussing on the Williams team as a whole, focussing on both Hill and David Coulthard, as well as team personnel.

References 

Formula One photographers
Living people
Year of birth missing (living people)